The 1987–88 season was the 18th season of the Portland Trail Blazers in the National Basketball Association (NBA).  The Blazers finished 53–29, fourth in the Western Conference, qualifying for the playoffs for the sixth consecutive year.  It was a four-game improvement over the previous season. In the 1988 NBA Playoffs, the Blazers were eliminated in the first round of the playoffs for the third straight year, this time falling to the Utah Jazz three games to one in the best-of-five series.

Kevin Duckworth averaged 15.8 points per game and was named Most Improved Player of The Year, while Clyde Drexler was selected for the 1988 NBA All-Star Game. Steve Johnson was also selected, but did not play due to injury.

Draft picks

Roster

Regular season

Season standings

z - clinched division title
y - clinched division title
x - clinched playoff spot

Record vs. opponents

Game log

Regular season

|- align="center" bgcolor="#ccffcc"
| 1
| November 6
| Phoenix
| W 118–104
|
|
|
| Memorial Coliseum
| 1–0
|- align="center" bgcolor="#ccffcc"
| 2
| November 7
| @ L.A. Clippers
| W 124–99
|
|
|
| Los Angeles Memorial Sports Arena
| 2–0
|- align="center" bgcolor="#ffcccc"
| 3
| November 10
| Houston
| L 111–118
|
|
|
| Memorial Coliseum
| 2–1
|- align="center" bgcolor="#ffcccc"
| 4
| November 12
| @ Denver
| L 113–126
|
|
|
| McNichols Sports Arena
| 2–2
|- align="center" bgcolor="#ffcccc"
| 5
| November 14
| @ Dallas
| L 116–127
|
|
|
| Reunion Arena
| 2–3
|- align="center" bgcolor="#ffcccc"
| 6
| November 17, 19877:30 pm PST
| @ L.A. Lakers
| L 115–142
|
|
|
| The Forum16,347
| 2–4
|- align="center" bgcolor="#ffcccc"
| 7
| November 18
| @ Seattle
| L 114–120
|
|
|
| Seattle Center Coliseum
| 2–5
|- align="center" bgcolor="#ccffcc"
| 8
| November 20
| Washington
| W 120–101
|
|
|
| Memorial Coliseum
| 3–5
|- align="center" bgcolor="#ccffcc"
| 9
| November 22
| Indiana
| W 120–110
|
|
|
| Memorial Coliseum
| 4–5
|- align="center" bgcolor="#ccffcc"
| 10
| November 24
| Sacramento
| W 98–94
|
|
|
| Memorial Coliseum
| 5–5
|- align="center" bgcolor="#ccffcc"
| 11
| November 27
| L.A. Clippers
| W 97–87
|
|
|
| Memorial Coliseum
| 6–5
|- align="center" bgcolor="#ccffcc"
| 12
| November 29
| New Jersey
| W 125–104
|
|
|
| Memorial Coliseum
| 7–5

|- align="center" bgcolor="#ccffcc"
| 13
| December 1
| Phoenix
| W 102–100
|
|
|
| Memorial Coliseum
| 8–5
|- align="center" bgcolor="#ccffcc"
| 14
| December 2, 19877:30 pm PST
| @ L.A. Lakers
| W 117–104
|
|
|
| The Forum17,505
| 9–5
|- align="center" bgcolor="#ccffcc"
| 15
| December 5
| @ Phoenix
| W 133–115
|
|
|
| Arizona Veterans Memorial Coliseum
| 10–5
|- align="center" bgcolor="#ccffcc"
| 16
| December 6
| New York
| W 117–99
|
|
|
| Memorial Coliseum
| 11–5
|- align="center" bgcolor="#ffcccc"
| 17
| December 8, 19874:30 pm PST
| @ Detroit
| L 117–127
|
|
|
| Pontiac Silverdome17,126
| 11–6
|- align="center" bgcolor="#ffcccc"
| 18
| December 9
| @ Philadelphia
| L 86–94
|
|
|
| The Spectrum
| 11–7
|- align="center" bgcolor="#ffcccc"
| 19
| December 11
| @ Milwaukee
| L 112–125
|
|
|
| MECCA Arena
| 11–8
|- align="center" bgcolor="#ccffcc"
| 20
| December 12
| @ Indiana
| W 108–101
|
|
|
| Market Square Arena
| 12–8
|- align="center" bgcolor="#ccffcc"
| 21
| December 15
| Seattle
| W 128–109
|
|
|
| Memorial Coliseum
| 13–8
|- align="center" bgcolor="#ccffcc"
| 22
| December 18
| @ Phoenix
| W 129–114
|
|
|
| Arizona Veterans Memorial Coliseum
| 14–8
|- align="center" bgcolor="#ccffcc"
| 23
| December 20
| San Antonio
| W 148–126
|
|
|
| Memorial Coliseum
| 15–8
|- align="center" bgcolor="#ccffcc"
| 24
| December 22
| Golden State
| W 136–91
|
|
|
| Memorial Coliseum
| 16–8
|- align="center" bgcolor="#ffcccc"
| 25
| December 26
| @ Cleveland
| L 117–120
|
|
|
| Richfield Coliseum
| 16–9
|- align="center" bgcolor="#ffcccc"
| 26
| December 29
| @ New York
| L 110–123
|
|
|
| Madison Square Garden
| 16–10
|- align="center" bgcolor="#ccffcc"
| 27
| December 30
| @ Washington
| W 117–112
|
|
|
| Capital Centre
| 17–10

|- align="center" bgcolor="#ccffcc"
| 28
| January 1
| Philadelphia
| W 127–125
|
|
|
| Memorial Coliseum
| 18–10
|- align="center" bgcolor="#ffcccc"
| 29
| January 3, 19885:00 pm PST
| L.A. Lakers
| L 81–98
|
|
|
| Memorial Coliseum12,666
| 18–11
|- align="center" bgcolor="#ccffcc"
| 30
| January 5
| Seattle
| W 126–114
|
|
|
| Memorial Coliseum
| 19–11
|- align="center" bgcolor="#ccffcc"
| 31
| January 8
| Sacramento
| W 98–91
|
|
|
| Memorial Coliseum
| 20–11
|- align="center" bgcolor="#ffcccc"
| 32
| January 13
| @ Utah
| L 104–116
|
|
|
| Salt Palace
| 20–12
|- align="center" bgcolor="#ffcccc"
| 33
| January 14
| @ Houston
| L 98–103
|
|
|
| The Summit
| 20–13
|- align="center" bgcolor="#ccffcc"
| 34
| January 16
| @ San Antonio
| W 121–120
|
|
|
| HemisFair Arena
| 21–13
|- align="center" bgcolor="#ffcccc"
| 35
| January 19
| Dallas
| L 116–120
|
|
|
| Memorial Coliseum
| 21–14
|- align="center" bgcolor="#ccffcc"
| 36
| January 22
| Denver
| W 126–106
|
|
|
| Memorial Coliseum
| 22–14
|- align="center" bgcolor="#ccffcc"
| 37
| January 24, 19887:00 pm PST
| Detroit
| W 119–111
|
|
|
| Memorial Coliseum12,666
| 23–14
|- align="center" bgcolor="#ccffcc"
| 38
| January 26
| Milwaukee
| W 112–106
|
|
|
| Memorial Coliseum
| 24–14
|- align="center" bgcolor="#ffcccc"
| 39
| January 27
| @ Golden State
| L 110–115
|
|
|
| Oakland–Alameda County Coliseum Arena
| 24–15
|- align="center" bgcolor="#ccffcc"
| 40
| January 29
| Phoenix
| W 128–119
|
|
|
| Memorial Coliseum
| 25–15

|- align="center" bgcolor="#ccffcc"
| 41
| February 2
| Atlanta
| W 121–118
|
|
|
| Memorial Coliseum
| 26–15
|- align="center" bgcolor="#ffcccc"
| 42
| February 4
| Utah
| L 123–126
|
|
|
| Memorial Coliseum
| 26–16
|- align="center" bgcolor="#ccffcc"
| 43
| February 9
| Seattle
| W 139–123
|
|
|
| Memorial Coliseum
| 27–16
|- align="center" bgcolor="#ffcccc"
| 44
| February 11
| @ Sacramento
| L 113–123
|
|
|
| ARCO Arena
| 27–17
|- align="center" bgcolor="#ccffcc"
| 45
| February 12
| Denver
| W 120–105
|
|
|
| Memorial Coliseum
| 28–17
|- align="center" bgcolor="#ffcccc"
| 46
| February 14
| Houston
| L 103–115
|
|
|
| Memorial Coliseum
| 28–18
|- align="center" bgcolor="#ffcccc"
| 47
| February 15
| @ Utah
| L 94–112
|
|
|
| Salt Palace
| 28–19
|- align="center" bgcolor="#ccffcc"
| 48
| February 17
| @ L.A. Clippers
| W 110–96
|
|
|
| Los Angeles Memorial Sports Arena
| 29–19
|- align="center" bgcolor="#ffcccc"
| 49
| February 19
| Boston
| L 104–124
|
|
|
| Memorial Coliseum
| 29–20
|- align="center" bgcolor="#ccffcc"
| 50
| February 21
| San Antonio
| W 117–112
|
|
|
| Memorial Coliseum
| 30–20
|- align="center" bgcolor="#ccffcc"
| 51
| February 23
| @ New Jersey
| W 114–102
|
|
|
| Brendan Byrne Arena
| 31–20
|- align="center" bgcolor="#ffcccc"
| 52
| February 24
| @ Boston
| L 112–113
|
|
|
| Boston Garden
| 31–21
|- align="center" bgcolor="#ffcccc"
| 53
| February 26
| @ Chicago
| W 104–96
|
|
|
| Chicago Stadium
| 32–21
|- align="center" bgcolor="#ccffcc"
| 54
| February 27
| @ Atlanta
| W 123–120
|
|
|
| The Omni
| 33–21
|- align="center" bgcolor="#ccffcc"
| 55
| February 29
| Cleveland
| W 107–94
|
|
|
| Memorial Coliseum
| 34–21

|- align="center" bgcolor="#ccffcc"
| 56
| March 3
| @ Phoenix
| W 135–112
|
|
|
| Arizona Veterans Memorial Coliseum
| 35–21
|- align="center" bgcolor="#ccffcc"
| 57
| March 5
| Golden State
| W 123–117
|
|
|
| Memorial Coliseum
| 36–21
|- align="center" bgcolor="#ccffcc"
| 58
| March 8
| @ Dallas
| W 112–110
|
|
|
| Reunion Arena
| 37–21
|- align="center" bgcolor="#ccffcc"
| 59
| March 10
| @ Houston
| W 112–109
|
|
|
| The Summit
| 38–21
|- align="center" bgcolor="#ccffcc"
| 60
| March 13
| L.A. Clippers
| W 121–100
|
|
|
| Memorial Coliseum
| 39–21
|- align="center" bgcolor="#ccffcc"
| 61
| March 15, 19887:30 pm PST
| L.A. Lakers
| W 112–95
|
|
|
| Memorial Coliseum
| 40–21
|- align="center" bgcolor="#ffcccc"
| 62
| March 17
| @ Denver
| L 115–116 (OT)
|
|
|
| McNichols Sports Arena
| 40–22
|- align="center" bgcolor="#ccffcc"
| 63
| March 18
| @ Golden State
| W 121–116
|
|
|
| Oakland–Alameda County Coliseum Arena
| 41–22
|- align="center" bgcolor="#ccffcc"
| 64
| March 20
| Dallas
| W 105–99
|
|
|
| Memorial Coliseum
| 42–22
|- align="center" bgcolor="#ffcccc"
| 65
| March 23
| @ Seattle
| L 108–118
|
|
|
| Seattle Center Coliseum
| 42–23
|- align="center" bgcolor="#ffcccc"
| 66
| March 25
| @ Dallas
| L 101–106
|
|
|
| Reunion Arena
| 42–24
|- align="center" bgcolor="#ffcccc"
| 67
| March 26
| @ Houston
| L 109–115
|
|
|
| The Summit
| 42–25
|- align="center" bgcolor="#ccffcc"
| 68
| March 29
| @ San Antonio
| W 136–113
|
|
|
| HemisFair Arena
| 43–25

|- align="center" bgcolor="#ffcccc"
| 69
| April 1
| Chicago
| L 101–116
|
|
|
| Memorial Coliseum
| 43–26
|- align="center" bgcolor="#ccffcc"
| 70
| April 3
| San Antonio
| W 110–107
|
|
|
| Memorial Coliseum
| 44–26
|- align="center" bgcolor="#ccffcc"
| 71
| April 5
| L.A. Clippers
| W 141–119
|
|
|
| Memorial Coliseum
| 45–26
|- align="center" bgcolor="#ccffcc"
| 72
| April 6
| @ L.A. Clippers
| W 111–103
|
|
|
| Los Angeles Memorial Sports Arena
| 46–26
|- align="center" bgcolor="#ffcccc"
| 73
| April 8
| @ Seattle
| L 100–114
|
|
|
| Seattle Center Coliseum
| 46–27
|- align="center" bgcolor="#ccffcc"
| 74
| April 9, 19887:30 pm PDT
| L.A. Lakers
| W 119–109
|
|
|
| Memorial Coliseum12,666
| 47–27
|- align="center" bgcolor="#ffcccc"
| 75
| April 12, 19887:30 pm PDT
| @ L.A. Lakers
| L 103–109
|
|
|
| The Forum17,505
| 47–28
|- align="center" bgcolor="#ccffcc"
| 76
| April 14
| @ Utah
| W 128–123
|
|
|
| Salt Palace
| 48–28
|- align="center" bgcolor="#ccffcc"
| 77
| April 15
| Golden State
| W 147–113
|
|
|
| Memorial Coliseum
| 49–28
|- align="center" bgcolor="#ccffcc"
| 78
| April 17
| Sacramento
| W 112–102
|
|
|
| Memorial Coliseum
| 50–28
|- align="center" bgcolor="#ffcccc"
| 79
| April 19
| Utah
| L 122–129
|
|
|
| Memorial Coliseum
| 50–29
|- align="center" bgcolor="#ccffcc"
| 80
| April 20
| @ Golden State
| W 131–117
|
|
|
| Oakland–Alameda County Coliseum Arena
| 51–29
|- align="center" bgcolor="#ccffcc"
| 81
| April 22
| Denver
| W 141–135 (OT)
|
|
|
| Memorial Coliseum
| 52–29
|- align="center" bgcolor="#ccffcc"
| 82
| April 23
| @ Sacramento
| W 124–110
|
|
|
| ARCO Arena
| 53–29

Playoffs

|- align="center" bgcolor="#ccffcc"
| 1
| April 28
| Utah
| W 108–96
| Clyde Drexler (26)
| Clyde Drexler (13)
| Terry Porter (12)
| Memorial Coliseum12,666
| 1–0
|- align="center" bgcolor="#ffcccc"
| 2
| April 30
| Utah
| L 105–114
| Clyde Drexler (25)
| Maurice Lucas (14)
| Terry Porter (7)
| Memorial Coliseum12,666
| 1–1
|- align="center" bgcolor="#ffcccc"
| 3
| May 4
| @ Utah
| L 108–113
| Jerome Kersey (23)
| Kevin Duckworth (16)
| Drexler, Porter (4)
| Salt Palace12,444
| 1–2
|- align="center" bgcolor="#ffcccc"
| 4
| May 6
| @ Utah
| L 96–111
| Kevin Duckworth (33)
| Kersey, Duckworth (10)
| Clyde Drexler (6)
| Salt Palace12,444
| 1–3
|-

Player statistics

Season

Playoffs

Awards and honors
 Clyde Drexler, All-NBA Second Team
 Kevin Duckworth, NBA Most Improved Player

Transactions

References

Portland Trail Blazers seasons
Portland Trail Blazers 1987
Portland Trail Blazers 1987
Port
Portland
Portland